Scott Christopher Chiasson (born August 14, 1977) is a former professional baseball pitcher. He graduated and was drafted out of Eastern Connecticut State University.

In  he signed with the Yokohama BayStars of the Japanese Central League but did not appear in a game. He began  with the Tigres de Quintana Roo of the Mexican League. On August 13, he signed with the Baltimore Orioles, who assigned him to the Norfolk Tides of the Triple-A International League.

On March 20, 2009, Chiasson was released by the Orioles. "Allowing the two Minor League veterans (the other one was Guillermo Quiroz) to try to hook on with another club before the end of spring."

Chiasson became head baseball coach at Ledyard High School in 2014. He also runs an AAU Program, called the CT Hurricanes, out of Norwich and Dodd Stadium. His program won the Triple Crown National Championship in 2016 down in Richmond, VA, and is widely regarded as one of the Elite Programs in all of New England.

External links

1977 births
Living people
American expatriate baseball players in Japan
American expatriate baseball players in Mexico
Arizona League Cubs players
Baseball players from Connecticut
Chicago Cubs players
Colorado Springs Sky Sox players
Eastern Connecticut State Warriors baseball players
Gulf Coast Royals players
Iowa Cubs players
Louisville Bats players
Major League Baseball pitchers
Mayos de Navojoa players
Mexican League baseball pitchers
Nippon Professional Baseball pitchers
Norfolk Tides players
Norwich Navigators players
Southern Oregon Timberjacks players
Sportspeople from Norwich, Connecticut
Tigres de Quintana Roo players
Visalia Oaks players
West Tennessee Diamond Jaxx players